Maurice Gramain (6 August 1911 – 26 March 1996) was a French sabre fencer. He competed at the 1936 and 1948 Summer Olympics.

References

External links
 

1911 births
1996 deaths
French male sabre fencers
Olympic fencers of France
Fencers at the 1936 Summer Olympics
Fencers at the 1948 Summer Olympics